Armenian Argentines are ethnic Armenians who live in Argentina. Estimates vary, but between 70,000 and 120,000 people of Armenian ancestry live in the country, forming one of the largest groups in the Armenian diaspora worldwide. The core of the population came from Cilicia, Syria and Lebanon.

History
According to researcher Kim Hekimian, the majority of Armenians arriving in the 1920s originated from the province of Adana in Cilicia of the Ottoman Empire. Most of these Armenians left their homelands either because of the deportations and massacres of the Armenian genocide. Immigrants from the cities of Marash, Hadjin, and Antep together accounted for approximately 60 percents of all incoming Cilician Armenians. The large number of immigrants from these cities was a result of Armenians following their friends and relatives who had emigrated earlier.

Once in Argentina, Armenians from the same city or town in Cilicia were inclined to group together and maintain their regional customs. The informal census taken by Ohannes Der Jachadurian in 1941 demonstrates that approximately 70 percent of the Armenians in Argentina originating from Hadjin resided in the southern neighborhoods of Buenos Aires, including Flores, Nueva Pompeya, and Villa Soldati. Some of these regional ties promoted the creation of at least twenty organizations in the 1930s. Of these organizations, only the Society of Hadjin, Society of Antep and Society of Marash are still in operation.

In addition to the arrival of Armenians from Cilicia, between 1917 and 1921, during the Russian Civil War, many Armenians from Russia escaped to avoid religious persecution. Between 1947 and 1954 many Armenians from the Soviet Union, Syria and Lebanon came to Argentina as a consequence of the Second World War, and from Iran because of the Iranian Revolution in 1979.

The Armenian community of Argentina has maintained its identity due to focus on the church, school and the family structure. Most of those who came in the mid-1920s escaped the Armenian genocide and Adana massacres.  The first Armenians came in 1908 and some came in 1915, but it was not until 1924-1930 that the community took shape when some 10,000 people settled in Buenos Aires. Subsequent waves of immigrants came from Russia, Romania and Greece. The influx dried up in the early 1950s. Today, the community is estimated to number 80,000. While survival was of paramount importance, education was also high on the agenda of the early immigrants. They had no money and few of them spoke a foreign language, therefore they gave a great deal of attention to education. Much of the Armenian community of Buenos Aires can be found in the Palermo neighborhood.

Religious life
Prior to the establishment of the church, the Armenians of Buenos Aires congregated on Sunday afternoons at a coffee shop on 25 de Mayo Street which was owned by a Jewish man from Smyrna. The coffee shop became such an established "center" for the Armenians that they used its address to receive mail from their family and friends from abroad. When more Armenian refugees arrived in Buenos Aires, the community managed to rent the Cathedral of St John the Baptist, an Anglican church which was near the coffee shop. Two Englishmen delivered sermons translated from Armenian by Haig Moscofian.

After the arrival of the first priest of the community Der Hayr Barasatian, the community became more religiously organized. After the Armenian community in Buenos Aires faced numerous financial crises, it constructed its first Armenian church in 1938.

Currently, the Armenian community of Argentina has nine Armenian churches.

Notable Armenian Argentines

Martín Adjemián, actor
León Arslanián, former Federal Judge and former Minister of Security of the Buenos Aires Province
Esteban Becker, football coach
José Andrés Bilibio, professional footballer
Norberto Briasco, professional footballer
Lucas Zelarayán, professional footballer
Efrain Chacurian, former professional footballer
János Czetz, a military commander during the Hungarian Revolution of 1848, and the organizer of Argentina's first national military academy
Eduardo Eurnekian, businessman
Pampero Firpo, professional wrestler
Alicia Ghiragossian, poet and translator 
Bedros Hadjian, journalist, writer and educator
Martín Karadagian, wrestler and actor
Paz Lenchantin, bass player
David Nalbandian, tennis player
Alicia Terzian, conductor, musicologist and composer 
Paola Vessvessian, congresswoman
Alex Yemenidjian, the former President of MGM
Fernando Zagharian, professional footballer

See also
Argentina–Armenia relations
Armenian diaspora
Centro Armenio de la República Argentina
Club Deportivo Armenio
Sardarabad (weekly)

References

External links

 Sardarabad – Armenian Spanish Newspaper
 IAN – Spanish speaking armenians around the world
 Armenios online
 Armenian Institute
 Diario Armenia
 Cámara Argentino – Armenia
 Tigran Ghanalanyan, Armenian Protestant communities in South America, http://noravank.am/eng/issues/detail.php?ELEMENT_ID=5722

 
Argentine
Ethnic groups in Argentina